Stefan Olof Ragnar Landberg (born 5 May 1970) is a Swedish football coach and former professional footballer who played as a midfielder.

Club career 
He played for Kalmar FF (1987–1989), Östers IF (1990–1994) and IFK Göteborg (1995–2000) during his career. He won two Allsvenskan titles while at IFK Göteborg, and was named the 2000 Årets Ärkeängel as IFK Göteborg's player of the year. He made a total of 196 appearances for IFK Göteborg, of which 106 was in Allsvenskan.

International career

Youth 
Landberg made 30 appearances for the Sweden U19, U21, and Olympic teams between 1987 and 1992, and represented Sweden at the 1992 Summer Olympics in Barcelona, Spain.

Senior 
He made his full international debut for Sweden on 11 November 1992, in a 1994 FIFA World Cup qualifier against Israel when he replaced Tomas Brolin in the 87th minute in a 3–1 win. He scored his first international goal for Sweden the following year on 2 June 1993, when Sweden beat Israel 5–0 in the return game of the 1994 FIFA World Cup qualifiers. He appeared in a total of five qualifiers for the 1994 FIFA World Cup, but did not make Sweden's final squad for the main tournament.

Landberg made his 17th and final international appearance for the Sweden national team on 16 February 1997, in a friendly 3–1 win against Thailand.

Coaching career 
He was later an assistant coach of IFK Göteborg, together with Kjell Pettersson under head coach Arne Erlandsen.

Career statistics

International 

Scores and results list Sweden's goal tally first, score column indicates score after each Landberg goal.

Honours 
IFK Göteborg

 Allsvenskan: 1995, 1996
Individual
 Årets ärkeängel (IFK Göteborg player of the year): 2000

References

Profile

1970 births
Living people
Swedish footballers
Sweden international footballers
Kalmar FF players
Östers IF players
IFK Göteborg players
Allsvenskan players
Sweden youth international footballers
Olympic footballers of Sweden
Footballers at the 1992 Summer Olympics

Association football midfielders